Eisenhower State Park is a state park in Osage County, Kansas, United States, located  northeast of Emporia and  south of Topeka.

The park was formerly known as Melvern State Park, due to its location on the north shore of the  Melvern Lake, was renamed in 1990 to honor former president Dwight D. Eisenhower. The park includes  of prairie,  of woodland, and various areas for recreational activities.

The  Melvern Wildlife Area adjacent to the park is home to a variety of wildlife, including white-tailed deer, eastern wild turkey, bobwhite quail, squirrels, various furbearers, and waterfowl making it a great place to observe or partake in hunting (by permission only). Hunting is allowed throughout the park except on the  waterfowl refuge, which is open to wildlife viewing from January 15 to October 1.

See also
 List of Kansas state parks
 List of lakes, reservoirs, and dams in Kansas
 List of rivers of Kansas
 Eisenhower State Park (Texas)

References

External links

State parks of Kansas
Protected areas of Osage County, Kansas